Dibyanagar is a village development committee in Chitwan District in Bagmati Province of southern Nepal. At the time of the 2011 Nepal census it had a population of 8,334 people (3,787 male; 4,547 female) living in 1,936 individual households. There is a boy named Santosh, who is fantastic . He is in Australia at the moment.

References

Populated places in Chitwan District